Mandla Daniel Mofokeng (born 11 September 1967) is a kwaito musician, singer and producer known as "Spikiri" from Meadowlands, Soweto and a member of the Kwaito group Trompies

He started his career as a dancer in 1985, under the tutelage of South African musician Sello "Chicco" Twala. He later formed a disco group called MM De Luxe with friend M'du Masilela in 1988.  This duo recorded two successful albums in 1989 and 1990 and introduced what came to be known as township kwaito today. His passion for music led Mandla to enroll at Fuba Music School in 1991 to study engineering and piano. In the 1990s he was producing music for the likes of Chimora, Kamazu, Senyaka and Fatty Boom Boom better known as Tsekeleke. Known for his unassuming demeanour, Mandla Mofokeng is a founder member of the seminal kwaito group Trompies, which has released a number of albums, some of which are regarded as classics of the genre. He is also a founder member and co-director of the influential record label Kalawa Jazzmee, which has released many well-known kwaito artists, including Boom Shaka, Bongo Muffin, Alaska, B.O.P (Brothers of Peace), and Thebe. Currently he sits on the board of directors at Kalawa Jazmee Recording company and is also one of the masterminds in the DCC (Dangerous Combination Crew) the production team of the company. His recent contributions include successful records by Brothers of Peace, Thebe, Bongo Maffin, Alaska, Mafikizolo, Jakarumba, MaWillies and Tokollo and Kabelo' solo projects. Most recently, he was one of the award-winning Mafikizolo and Kabelo' producers. Mandla 'Spikiri's diverse music talents can be witnessed in projects in which he has worked with artists from other music genres, these include Don Laka, Moses Molelekwa, Bra Hugh Masikela, Vicky Vilakazi and Hashi Elimhlopheh.

At the 2nd ceremony of Mzansi Kwaito and House Music Awards,  he won Best Kwaito Male Artist award.

References

1967 births
Living people
People from Soweto
South African Sotho people 
South African musicians